The Milagros' tiger (Parantica milagros) is a species of nymphalid butterfly in the Danainae subfamily. It is endemic to the Philippines.

References

Lepidoptera of the Philippines
Parantica
Taxonomy articles created by Polbot
Butterflies described in 1880